Stephen D. Fantone is an American businessman and optical engineer. A graduate of the University of Rochester, he founded the instrumentation firm Optikos. He is a fellow of SPIE and of Optica and served as the latter organization's president in 2020. Optica renamed its award for distinguished service in his honor in 2013.

In the late 1990s, Fantone consulted on the lensing system for Fisher-Price's revised View-Master toy.

From 2012 through 2020, Fantone chaired the board of directors of the Pioneer Institute, a free-market think tank in Massachusetts. Fantone is also president of the Partnership for Massachusetts' Future, an advocacy group of business organizations and entrepreneurs founded in response to Raise Up Massachusetts, a pro-labor advocacy coalition.

References

Living people
Fellows of Optica (society)
Presidents of Optica (society)
University of Rochester alumni
Year of birth missing (living people)